The Cardinal Kung Foundation is a not-for-profit Roman Catholic organization based in Stamford, Connecticut. Founded in 1994 by Joseph Kung, nephew of the late Cardinal Ignatius Kung Pin-Mei, the foundation monitors the treatment of Catholics in China and that portion of the Catholic Church in China that remains loyal to the Pope. The foundation's primarily tool is to supply news reports to news agencies about various activities in China and has been instrumental in protecting and aiding many notable Catholics in China.

History
One of the first successful efforts by Cardinal Kung Foundation to notify the media about an issue regarding China came in January 1994. In January 1994, the Cardinal Kung Foundation notified the Associated Press that Bishop Su Zhi-Ming had recently been arrested after meeting with U.S. Congressman Chris Smith in early January 1994.  Su  has previously spent up to 15 years in prison for his participation in the underground Catholic church. The Wichita Eagle picked up the story the following day and presented it to the readers in Wichita, Kansas.

References

 Rosenthal, Elisabeth. (October 6, 2002) The New York Times In China, Catholic Churches Flourish, but Under Controls. Section: 1; Page 11.
 Agence France-Presse (January 11, 1997) China in full-scale campaign to wipe out secret Catholics: report BEIJING, Jan 11 (AFP) - China has launched a hard-hitting campaign to wipe out all trace of its unauthorized Catholic church, the US-based Cardinal Kung Foundation said Saturday. Section: International.
 Agence France-Presse (November 7, 1997) Chinese Roman Catholic bishop remains in detention in northern China BEIJING, Nov 7 (AFP) - Roman Catholic bishop Su Zhimin, arrested in China early last month, was being detained in the northern city of Baoding, despite Vatican reports of his release, the US-based Cardinal Kung Foundation said Friday. Section: International.
Associated Press (March 12, 2000) Cardinal Kung , long imprisoned Catholic crusader in China, dies at 98.

External links
Cardinal Kung Foundation

Catholicism in China